The following is a list of rallies and protest marches in Washington, D.C., which shows the variety of expression of notable political views.  Events at the National Mall are located somewhere between the United States Capitol and the Lincoln Memorial.  The Mall is regulated by the National Park Service which is required to respect the free speech rights of Americans.

Following a controversy over the Million Man March in 1995, the National Park Service stopped releasing crowd size estimates for rallies on the National Mall.  Crowd estimates after that point have come from protest organizers, researchers or news outlets.  Owing to different methodologies, estimates can vary greatly.

Most marches and rallies in Washington are one-time events.  Two exceptions are the March for Life and Rolling Thunder, both held annually.  The March for Life is a protest against abortion held on or near January 22 marking the anniversary of the Roe v. Wade Supreme Court case legalizing abortion.  The march has been held annually since 1974, typically drawing several hundred thousand demonstrators.  Rolling Thunder is a motorcycle demonstration held since 1987 on Memorial Day to raise awareness of issues related to American Prisoner of War/Missing in action.

Before 1900 

 1894 – March 16 to May 1, Fry's Army. Protest march by unemployed workers.
 1894 – March 25 to May 1, Coxey's Army. Protest march by unemployed workers.

1900–1949 
 1913 – March 3, Woman Suffrage Procession. 5,000 march to support women's voting rights the day President-elect Woodrow Wilson arrived for his swearing in the next day.
 1914 – April–May, Coxey's Army Second March.
 1925 – August 8, Ku Klux Klan march. Between 25,000 and 50,000 Ku Klux Klan members march to show support for the KKK and demand immigration restrictions based on race and nation of origin.
 1931 – December 6, Hunger March. Communist-led march of unemployed workers from across the country.
 1932 – January 6, Cox's Army. A march of 25,000 unemployed Pennsylvanians to encourage Congress to start a public works program.
 1932 – May–July, Bonus Army. March by 20,000 World War I veterans and their families seeking advance payment of bonuses from the Hoover administration; two killed.
 1939 – April 9, Marian Anderson concert.  75,000 estimated attendance.  Integrated concert at Lincoln Memorial held in defiance of DAR refusal to host her performance
 1943 – October 6, Rabbis' march. Protest for American and allied action to stop the destruction of European Jewry.

1950–1999

2000–2009 

 2000 – April 16, Protests of the IMF/World Bank meeting.  Supporting march for the A16 street blockades of an IMF/World Bank meeting.
 2000 – April 28 – 30, Millennium March on Washington. LBGT political rally.
 2000 – May 14, Million Mom March.  March against gun violence.
 2000 – August 26, Rev. Al Sharpton organized the "Redeem the Dream" march in Washington DC commemorating the 37th anniversary of Rev. Martin Luther King's "I Have a Dream" speech.
 2000 – September 26, Brides March Against Domestic Violence. Demonstration of several women in wedding dresses marching to raise domestic violence awareness.
 2000 – October 16, Million Family March
 2001 –  January 20, Counter-Inaugural demonstrations against President George W. Bush
 2001 – September 29, Anti-Capitalist Convergence. Originally an organized protest to counter planned World Bank and IMF meetings, many protesters backed out after the World Bank and IMF canceled their meetings in the wake of the September 11 attacks.  The protest was turned into the first of several protests against the invasion of Afghanistan, the first major action of the post–September 11 anti-war movement.
 2002 - April 15, National Rally in Solidarity With Israel.  100,000 people rally in support of the State of Israel.
 2002 – August 17, Millions for Reparations March. This march, held on the National Mall, called for reparations for slavery in the United States. Various speakers talked about the state of racism in the U.S., and the need to redress the wrongs of the past.
 2002 – October 26, Protests against the Iraq War. Attended by over 100,000 people.
 2003 – January 18, Anti-war Demonstration.  Between "10s of thousands" and 200,000 in attendance on the National Mall.
 2004 – April 25, March for Women's Lives.  A pro-choice march; between 500,000 and 1,100,000 attend.
 2004 – October 17, Million Worker March.
 2005 – January 20, Counter-inaugural protests.  Demonstrations against George W. Bush's second inauguration.
 2005 – September 24, Anti-War in Iraq protest.
 2005 – October 15, Millions More Movement.  March to commemorate the 10th Anniversary of the Million Man March.
 2006 – March 6, ProjectMARCH.  March for colon cancer screening for all adults
 2007 – January 27, January 27, 2007 anti-war protest. Sponsored by United for Peace and Justice.
 2007 – March 17, March 17, 2007 anti-war protest.  March against the Iraq War sponsored by ANSWER Coalition.
 2007 – June 10, June 10, 2007 anti-Israeli occupation protest.  Rally and march against the Israeli occupation of the Palestinian territories for peace and anti-violence.
 2007 – September 15, September 15, 2007 anti-war protest.  March against the Iraq War sponsored by ANSWER Coalition.
 2007 – October 19–20, October Rebellion.  Series of demonstrations protesting the policies of the World Bank and International Monetary Fund.
 2007 – Unnamed date, Unnamed date, Myanmar political protest. March against the strict, Burmese government. Consists of some Americans, Burmese people, and Asian-American Burmese people.
 2008 – March 19, March 19, 2008 anti-war protest.
 2008 – April 19, National Socialist Movement protest march. Against illegal immigration.
 2008 – June 1, Jewish Federation of Greater Washington.  Israel at sixty years celebration.
 2008 – July 11, Hundreds of the Longest Walk 2 participants and supporters from the US, Canada, Mexico, Japan, Poland, and many Native American nations finish their 8000 miles walk from Alcatraz Island in San Francisco to Washington, D.C. Walkers, gathered to "protect sacred sites", "defend human rights", and "clean Mother Earth" by the American Indian Movement co-founder Dennis Banks and other native leaders, present their Manifesto for a Change to Rep. John Conyers at the Capitol Hill. Two days of pow-wow and concerts at the Mall follow.
 2008 – July 12, Revolution March. Rally and march protesting numerous violations of the U.S. Constitution due to the Iraq Invasion, Federal Reserve, Internal Revenue Service, and policies of the Bush Administration.  Over 10,000 people marched, participated in the rally, and enjoyed the musical guests.  Keynote speaker: Ron Paul, Guest Speakers: Naomi Wolf, G. Edward Griffin, Thomas E. Woods, Jr., Chuck Baldwin, Adam Kokesh, Tom Mullen and more.
 2008 – July 19, Over 9000 Anonymous March.  Protest at the Lincoln Memorial by Anonymous against the Church of Scientology.
 2008 – November 15, Anti-Proposition 8. Protest against the passage of California Proposition 8.
 2009 – January 10, ANSWER Coalition protest against Israeli bombing of civilians of Gaza.
 2009 – March 19, Funk the War 7. Sponsored by the DC chapter of Students for a Democratic Society.
 2009 – March 21, March 21, 2009 anti-war protest. A march on the Pentagon and Crystal City, Virginia sponsored by ANSWER.
 2009 – April 15, Tea Party protests. Against high taxes and big government in Lafayette Park. 
 2009 – April 25, IMF and World Bank protest march.
 2009 – June 18–21, Protest against the disputed Iranian elections.
 2009 – July 4, Tea Party protest. Opposing fiscal policies of Obama administration and Congress.
 2009 – September 12, Taxpayer March on Washington. Largest Tea Party rally on Washington protesting excess taxation and promoting fiscal responsibility.
 2009 – October 11, National Equality March. Approximately 200,000 people demonstrated in support of equal protection for lesbian, gay, bisexual, and transgender people.

2010 

 March 20 – March 20, 2010 anti-war protest. March on the White House against wars in Afghanistan and Iraq.
 March 21 – March for America. 200,000 people call for comprehensive immigration reform.
 August 28 – Restoring Honor Rally, cosponsored by Special Operations Warrior Foundation and promoted as a "celebration of America's heroes and heritage." The number of attendees is disputed.  Event organizer Glenn Beck also held an event at the Kennedy Center called "Divine Destiny" focused more on faith and religion on 8/27.
 September 27 – Appalachia Rising, a march of 4,000 residents from across Appalachia, to the EPA and the White House, demanding an end to destructive Mountaintop removal mining practices. About 113 people were arrested in front of the White House as part of a direct action protest, including Jim Hansen, known as the father of the global warming movement. A series of workshops and seminars were held by the event's organizers at Georgetown University the weekend directly prior to the march, discussing topics such as Green Jobs, Appalachian History, and political organizing.
 October 2 – One Nation Working Together March for Jobs, Peace and Justice. Rally at the Lincoln Memorial to press for immigration reform, financial reform.
 October 30 – Rally to Restore Sanity and/or Fear – Held by talk show hosts Jon Stewart and Stephen Colbert to oppose radical political trends in American politics. A crowd estimate commissioned by CBS News by AirPhotosLive.com estimated 215,000 people attended, with a margin of error of plus or minus 10 percent. According to Brian Stelter of the New York Times, the National Park Service privately told Viacom there were "well over 200,000" people present.
 December 16 – Veterans for Peace rally in Lafayette Park and on the White House sidewalk. 131 people arrested for blocking the view of the White House per 36 CFR 7.96 (g)(5)(viii), the "ten yards" rule, upheld in 1984–5271 in the White House Vigil for the ERA v. Clark, as a time-place-manner exception to the First Amendment, to achieve a fundamental purpose of the Park Service specified in USC16 article 1.

2011 
 October 1 – Occupy D.C.
 October 16 – The Right2Know March for Genetically Engineered Foods (GMO) to be labeled in the United States.  The march left New York City on October 1 and arrived after marching 313 miles to the White House.  More than 1000 people participated in the march.
 October 15 – Jobs and Justice march to protest poverty, homelessness and high unemployment.
 November 9–23 – Occupy Wall Street protesters march from New York City to Washington DC, to demonstrate at a congressional committee meeting to decide whether to keep President Barack Obama's extension of tax cuts enacted under former President George W. Bush. Protesters say the cuts benefit only rich Americans.

2012 
 January 11 – Close Guantanamo – 271 people in jumpsuits marched from the White House to the Supreme Court, along with 750 others not in jumpsuits.
 February 20 – Veterans Support Ron Paul, March on the White House – Approximately 320 – 558 Veterans and active duty Veterans Marched, with another 1500 supporting behind the march.  Upon arriving at the White House, the veterans and active military service members turned their backs to symbolically signify that they didn't condone recent wars. There was an eight-minute hand salute for every active duty military member who had committed suicide under Obama. There was a rally for 2 hours before the march at the Washington Memorial and a 6-hour after party at the rock n roll hotel.
March 24 – Reason Rally – The Reason Rally was a rally for secularism and religious skepticism held on the National Mall in Washington, D.C. on March 24, 2012. Approximately 20,000 people in attendance.  [1][2] The rally was sponsored by major atheistic and secular organizations of the United States and was regarded as a "Woodstock for atheists and skeptics".  Future events include "Reason Rally 2016", scheduled for June 2, 2016 at the Lincoln Memorial.
July 28 – Stop the Frack Attack Rally – 5,000 people marched calling for an end of dangerous and dirty drilling using the process of fracking. The march led to the formation of the Stop the Frack Attack Network.
November 3 – Million Puppet March – Approximately 1,500 people and puppets marched in support of continued funding for public broadcasting. The march was later recognized as the largest puppet march by RecordSetter.
November 17 – Move:DC – Approximately 10,000 people marched around the White House to call for an end to the LRA in Central Africa, with the march concluding at the Washington Monument. The march and rally were organized by Invisible Children as a part of the Kony 2012 campaign.

2013 
 January 26 – March on Washington for Gun Control – After Sandy Hook Elementary School shooting in December 2012.
 February 17 – Forward on Climate – An estimated 40,000 people rallied on the Mall and marched to the White House demanding action on Climate Change from President Barack Obama and the US Government. Particular focus was put on stopping the expansion of the Keystone Pipeline.
 September 7 – NO War Against Syria – Over 500 people gathered to demand an end to the drive to war. Organized by the ANSWER Coalition, the protest was supported by a wide range of organizations including Code Pink, United National Anti-war Coalition and the All-African People's Revolutionary Party.
 October 13 – "Million Vet March" – Thousands of protesters expressed their dissatisfaction over the closure of national memorials honoring the service of American veterans in combat administered by the National Park Service which have been officially closed due to the United States federal government shutdown of 2013.  Protesters removed barricades (or "Barrycades" as coined by the protesters) from the National World War II Memorial and brought them to the fence surrounding the White House. Senator Ted Cruz and Sarah Palin made appearances at this rally.

2014 
 December 13 – Justice for All – Thousands march to call attention to the recent deaths of unarmed African American men at the hands of police.

2015 
 August 26 – Women's Equality Day  – March and Rally from St. Stephen's Episcopal Church  to National Mall, Washington, D.C. 
 October 10 – 20th Anniversary of the Million Man March: Justice or Else – to commemorate the twentieth anniversary of the Million Man March.

2016 

 April – Democracy Spring – March to Washington, D.C. and sit-ins for progressive reforms.
 May – (Break Free) March from Lafayette Park to Lincoln Memorial protesting for divestment from fossil fuels and stopping offshore drilling.
 July 16 – Together 2016 rally – Louie Giglio, Francis Chan and musical groups and musicians, including Hillsong United and Lecrae, participated in a gathering of thousands of evangelicals on the National Mall. Although the event was originally scheduled to conclude at 9 p.m., it ended at 4 p.m. due to excessive heat. Officers reportedly responded to 350 medical calls for heat-related injuries. The large number of people who lost consciousness because of heat syncope overwhelmed emergency medical technicians.
 August 26 – Women's Equality Day – March and Rally from St. Stephen's Episcopal Church to National Mall, Washington, D.C.
 September 11 – Restoring Freedom – Hundreds protested the Unconstitutional practices of the Family Court systems.

2017 
 January 20 – The DisruptJ20 Protests. Actions that occurred in Washington, DC that attempted to disrupt events of the presidential inauguration of the 45th U.S. President, Donald Trump. 
 January 21 – Women's March on Washington, estimated 1,500,000 protesters marched in the Nation's Capital (with over 1.3 million estimated marched across the United States), and another 3,200,000 marched across the world to promote women's rights, immigration reform, and LGBTQ rights, and to address racial inequities, worker's issues, and environmental issues. This marks the protest as the largest combined protest across the United States.
 January 27 – The annual March for Life protest through Washington, D.C. in dissent of the decision made in the 1973 Supreme Court case Roe v. Wade. 
 January 28 – 2017 United States Donald Trump airport protests Thousands of protesters across varying U.S. airports to protest Donald Trump's Executive Order 13769. In implementation of the order, an estimated 375 travelers were affected by the order.  
 January 29 – More than 5,000 protesters marched from the White House to the U.S. Capitol to demonstrate opposition to the Border Security and Immigration Enforcement Improvements executive order. Thousands of protesters also appeared at airports across the country.
 March 4 – March 4 Trump
 March 10 – Native People's March on Washington - Thousands of primarily Indigenous people marched from west of Union Station to Lafyette square. The march was led in part by members of the Standing Rock Sioux Tribe and protested the Dakota Access Pipeline, broken treaties, and the U.S. Government's treatment of Indigenous people. The event began on March 7, when a symbolic Tipi camp was erected at the Washington Monument.
 April 15 – Tax March, The intent of the march was to pressure U.S. President Donald Trump to release his tax returns.
 April 22 – March for Science, The march in Washington drew about 40,000 participants and proceeded to the National Mall where scientists and others discussed their work and the importance of evidence-based policy.
 April 29 – People's Climate March. Between 100,000 and 200,000 protested, in unseasonably warm temperatures, Trump's anti-climate agenda
 May 1 – May Day Action: Immigrants and Workers March
 May 28 – PGA Trump Protest on Memorial Day weekend against President Trump's with the internet of disrupting Senior PGA Senior Championship at Trump National Golf Course Washington DC to be broadcast live on NBC.
 June 3 – About 100,000 protesters participated in the March for Truth to demand a large scale and quick investigation of American and Russian political collusion in the 2016 election.    
 June 11 – National Pride March
 August 26 – Women's Equality Day – March and Rally from St. Stephen's Episcopal Church to National Mall, Washington, D.C.
 September 16 – Juggalo March on Washington to protest the FBI gang label (see Juggalo gangs)
 September 16 – Mother of All Rallies at The National Mall in Washington D.C.
 September 18 – Restoring Freedom: March to protest the Family Court systems.
 September 30 – March for Racial Justice; March for Black Women
 October 7 – National Popular Vote March for 2020

2018 
 January 19 – March for Life 2018 - The annual March for Life protest through Washington, D.C. in dissent of the decision made in the 1973 Supreme Court case Roe v. Wade.
 January 20 & 21 – 2018 Women's March - Thousands took to the streets on the anniversary of the inauguration of Donald Trump as president of the United States.
 March 24 – March for Our Lives
 April 14 – March for Science - This year the main focus was on direct advocacy, encouraging people to get involved to build a future where science informs the policies that impact our lives and communities.
 June 28 – Women Disobey, Protest against the Trump administration family separation policy.  
 June 30 – Families Belong Together, more than 30,000 people rallied in downtown D.C. to protest the Trump administration's immigration policies.
 August 12 – Unite the Right 2
 September 8 – Rise for Climate
 November 8 – Nobody Is Above the Law

2019 
 January 18 – March for Life 2019 - The annual March for Life protest through Washington, D.C. in dissent of the decision made in the 1973 Supreme Court case Roe v. Wade.
 January 18 – Indigenous Peoples March (and many other solidarity marches)
 January 19 – Women's March on Washington (and many other local marches)
 February 16 – Take Back the Vote, march on Washington before Congress introduces the new Voting Rights Act.
 March 14 – Kids at Washington Liberty, Yorktown, and other schools near D.C, marched against gun violence. Kids wore orange and held big signs to protest.
 March 15 – School strike for climate, international movement of school students, repeating event
 May 27 – Last ride by Rolling Thunder in Washington, DC.
 July 9 – Extinction Rebellion Rally demanding that Congress formally declare a climate emergency
 September – September 2019 climate strikes

2020

 February 8 – About one hundred members of the neo-Nazi group Patriot Front marched along the National Mall from the Lincoln Memorial to the U. S. Capitol.
 May 31 – Ongoing protests over the murder of George Floyd begin in Minneapolis, with the protests quickly spreading nationally. George Floyd protests in Washington, D.C. and its suburbs continued into June, drawing thousands.
 August 28 – Tens of thousands gathered to commemorate the 57th anniversary of the March on Washington, which was announced in June during the funeral of George Floyd and will be led by Rev. Al Sharpton along with the NAACP.
 October 3 – Unsilent Majority March On Washington
 November 14 – Thousands of protesters marched to support Donald Trump and his claims of voter fraud in the November 3 election .
 December 12 - Thousands of Trump supporters, including a large group of Proud Boys, to protest electoral vote counts. In clashes with counter-protesters, 4 people are stabbed.

2021

 January 6 – A crowd gathered for the 'Save America' march to express grievances over the allegedly fraudulent 2020 election.  This gathering was immediately followed by the 2021 storming of the United States Capitol
 April 12- Protestors marched through D.C. to protest the killing of Daunte Wright. The group met at Meridian Hill Park, before marching through Dupont Circle and its Metro station.
 July 11 - 3000 people rally against anti-semitism.
 September 18 - Protest to support those jailed because of their actions during the January 6th 2021 storming of the United States Capitol. Several hundred held a rally in Union Square park in front of the Capitol. Four arrests were made.

2022

 January 23 - Thousands of protesters began marching at Washington D.C. on Sunday, planning to march from the Washington Monument to the Lincoln Memorial, in protest of the federal mandates for vaccination against COVID-19. The Federal Bureau of Investigation, Department of Homeland Security, and Metropolitan Police have been monitoring the organization of the protests for weeks and began taking early measures against the protests.
 May 12 - Million Nurse March. Nurses from across the country took part in the Million Nurse March in D.C. to protest pay caps and demand better conditions.

2023

 February 19 - Rage Against the War Machine, an anti-war rally organized by the Libertarian Party (United States) and the People's Party (United States) supported by a coalition of multiple anti-war organizations and speakers.

See also 
 List of incidents of political violence in Washington, D.C.
 List of protests in the United States
 List of incidents of civil unrest in the United States
 Timeline of Washington, D.C.

References

Further reading 
 Barber, Lucy G. Marching on Washington: The Forging of an American Political Tradition. Berkeley and Los Angeles: University of California Press, 2002. 

Protest march
 
Washington, D.C.
Protest marches on Washington, D.C.